The Bulletin de la Société Géologique de France, otherwise known as BSGF - Earth Sciences Bulletin is a peer-reviewed open access scientific journal covering Earth sciences. The journal publishes articles, short communications, reviews, comments and replies. It is published by EDP Sciences and the editor-in-chief is Laurent Jolivet (Sorbonne Université, Paris). The journal was established in 1830. It is a publication of the Société géologique de France. Most of the older content, published before 1924 is available online at the Biodiversity Heritage Library.

The journal is a historically important venue for great debates on the various interpretations of the history of the earth and the history of life between 1830 and 1860.

Abstracting and indexing
The journal is abstracted and indexed in:

Biological taxa first described in this journal

Many new genera and species have been first described in this journal. For example:
 The crocodyliform genus Siamosuchus was first described in the Bulletin in 2007.
 The dinosaur genus Atsinganosaurus was first described in the Bulletin in 2010.

Notable scientists who have published in this journal

 The French geologist Gabriel Auguste Daubrée
 The French geologist René Chudeau
 The taxonomist Robert Hoffstetter
 The French palaeontologist Marcellin Boule
 The French geologist and palaeontologist Henri Coquand
 The French geologist and palaeontologist Jean Albert Gaudry
 The French geologist Pierre-Marie Termier
 The French geologist Charles Lory
 The Swiss geologist and palaeontologist Hans Georg Stehlin

References

External links
 

Publications established in 1830
Open access journals
EDP Sciences academic journals
Geology journals